Abarjes (also Romanized as Abarjas and Abarjīs; also known as Abrjish) is a village in Kahak Rural District, Kahak District, Qom County, Qom Province, Iran. At the 2006 census, its population was 142, in 46 families.

References 

Populated places in Qom Province